Mellody Hobson (born April 3, 1969) is an American businesswoman who is president and co-CEO of Ariel Investments, and the chairwoman of Starbucks Corporation. She is the former chairwoman of DreamWorks Animation, having stepped down after negotiating the acquisition of DreamWorks Animation SKG, Inc., by NBCUniversal in August 2016.  In 2017, she became the first African-American woman to head The Economic Club of Chicago.  She was also named to chair the board of directors of Starbucks in 2021, making her one of the highest profile corporate directors in the US.

As of 2020, she is listed as #94 in Forbes list of the World's 100 Most Powerful Women. On December 26, 2020 it was announced she was being named the chairwoman of Starbucks Corp., the first black woman to be chairperson of an S&P 500 company.

Early life and education
The youngest in a family of six children, Hobson graduated from St. Ignatius College Prep in Chicago in 1987 and from Princeton University in 1991. At Princeton, Hobson was a member of the Cottage Club.

Career
Soon after her graduation from Princeton, Hobson joined Ariel Investments, a Chicago investment firm that manages nearly $13 billion in assets  as an intern. She rose to become the firm's senior vice president and director of marketing. In 2000, she ascended to become the company's president. It is also one of the largest African American-owned money management and mutual fund companies in the US. She was a contributor to financial segments on Good Morning America for many years.

Hobson is also chairman of the board of trustees of Ariel Investment Trust. She is a regular contributor on financial issues on CBS This Morning and formerly a spokesperson for the annual Ariel/Schwab Black Investor Survey.

Hobson is on the board of many organizations, including JPMorgan Chase & Co., the Chicago Public Education Fund, the Lucas Museum of Narrative Art and the Sundance Institute. She is also on the board of directors of the Starbucks Corporation, and formerly of The Estée Lauder Companies Inc. Hobson has been acclaimed in selections such as Time's 2015 Time 100 List, the magazine's annual list of the one hundred most influential people in the world)., Ebony magazine's "20 Leaders of the Future" (1992), Working Women Magazine's "20 Under 30" (1992), the World Economic Forum's "Global Leaders of Tomorrow" (2001), Esquire's "America's Best and Brightest" (2002), The Wall Street Journal's 50 "Women to Watch" (2004).

Hobson created and hosted a show on ABC on May 29, 2009, called Unbroke: What You Need to Know About Money, featuring celebrities such as the Jonas Brothers, Oscar the Grouch and Samuel L. Jackson.

In the American television drama The Good Wife, actress Vanessa L. Williams based her character, self-made businesswoman Courtney Paige, on Hobson, studying her via Hobson's TED talks.

In 2017, Hobson was named to head the Economic Club of Chicago, the first African-American woman to do so.

On August 6, 2017, Hobson guest hosted CBS Sunday Morning's annual "Money Issue" episode.

On June 4, 2018, Hobson was named as vice-chair of Starbucks Corporation. After heading the finance committee she was elected to chair the board in 2020.

On October 8, 2020, Mellody Hobson and the Hobson/Lucas Family Foundation made the lead gift to establish a new residential college at Princeton University. Hobson College will be the first residential college at Princeton named for a Black woman and will be built on the site of First College, formerly known as Wilson College.

On June 7, 2022, Hobson joined the Walton-Penner group (consisting of S. Robson Walton, Greg Penner, Carrie Walton Penner, Condoleezza Rice, and Sir Lewis Hamilton) to purchase the Denver Broncos.  On August 9, 2022, the NFL owners approved the purchase of the Denver Broncos by the Walton-Penner group.

Awards 
Hobson was inducted as a Laureate of The Lincoln Academy of Illinois and awarded the Order of Lincoln (the State's highest honor) by the Governor of Illinois in 2018.

Personal life
Hobson began dating film director and producer George Lucas in 2006, after they met at a business conference. Hobson and Lucas announced their engagement in January 2013, and were married on June 22, 2013, at Lucas' Skywalker Ranch. They have one daughter together, Everest Hobson Lucas, who was born via surrogacy in August 2013.

Hobson was photographed by Annie Leibovitz for the 2016 Pirelli Calendar.

She appeared on the Jack Good Show in August 2017, where she accepted the City of Birmingham's deepest appreciation for her charitable work with Birmingham's Bright Leaders of Tomorrow.

References

External links 
 
 
 Mellody Hobson
 

1969 births
Living people
Lucases
African-American business executives
African-American investors
American women business executives
American chairpersons of corporations
American investors
American women investors
Businesspeople from Illinois
Directors of Starbucks
Lucases
Henry Crown Fellows
Princeton School of Public and International Affairs alumni
St. Ignatius College Prep alumni
Women corporate directors
21st-century African-American people
21st-century African-American women
20th-century African-American people
20th-century African-American women
21st-century American businesswomen
21st-century American businesspeople